Bashka Paeff (August 12, 1889 — January 24, 1979), was an American sculptor active near Boston, Massachusetts.

Bashka Paeff was known as the Subway sculptor for the pieces she modeled at the Park Street T station while working her way through art school at the Boston Museum School. She was especially known for realistic animal sculptures, war memorials, fountains and portraits which she created in the classical tradition.

Biography
Paeff was born into a Jewish family in Minsk, Russian Empire in 1889. When she was a year old, her family immigrated to the United States.  At the age of 13 or 14 she enrolled in Massachusetts College of Art and Design (then called Massachusetts Normal Art School) in Boston.  In addition to completing programs in drawing, painting, and art education, she studied sculpture with Cyrus Edwin Dallin and graduated in 1911. In 1914 she attended the School of the Museum of Fine Arts, Boston, where she studied with Bela Pratt, and was sometimes called the "Subway sculptor" because she worked at Boston's Park Street T station. She worked at the MacDowell Colony in Peterborough, New Hampshire on seven occasions from 1916 through 1937 and executed a sculpture of Mrs. Edward MacDowell seated in a chair.  Paeff married Samuel Montefiore Waxman, Professor of Romance Languages at Boston University.

Paeff was a member of the Guild of Boston Artists, the Detroit Society of Arts and Crafts, Boston Society of Architects and the Society of Arts and Crafts, Boston. In 1923, her listed address was 6 Pinckney Street, Boston, Massachusetts.

Today Paeff is perhaps best known for the Maine Sailors and Soldiers Memorial on Route 1 crossing from Portsmouth, New Hampshire into Kittery, Maine. Its creation was marred by some political controversy. She received her commission in 1924 from Governor Percival P. Baxter, but in 1925 his successor, Governor Ralph Brewster, rejected the piece as overly pacifist. Minor changes accommodated both men, and the revised sculpture was installed in 1926 in what is now called John Paul Jones Memorial Park. Another notable sculpture of a boy and his dog is located in Westbrook Maine. A friend of Paeff, Cornelia Warren commissioned the Warren Memorial Fountain to honor her father John E. Warren and it featured a crouched boy on a rock with a resting Belgian Police Hound at its base. The boy is directing a flow of water into a pool for the dog to drink. The boy was modeled after John Warren's grandson, Mortimer Warren, Jr. The dog was modeled after a pet of Boston attorney, Sherman Whipple. This sculpture was part of her 1919 show at the Guild of Boston Artists. The sculpture still stands on the shore of the Presumpscot River near the Warren Paper Mill.

Other notable pieces by Paeff include a fountain sculpture of a small boy with bird at the Boston Public Garden (Arlington Street entrance), a statue of Warren G. Harding's pet Airedale "Laddie Boy" cast from 19,000 US penny coins at the Smithsonian Institution, a bas relief of Ellen Swallow Richards at the Massachusetts Institute of Technology, and a relief depicting the Battle of Lexington near Buckman Tavern in Lexington, Massachusetts. Boy and Bird is featured on the Boston Women's Heritage Trail. Her high relief bronze, the "Chaplains' Memorial" honoring World War I veterans is prominently installed in the Massachusetts State House outside the House Meeting Room.

In 1956 the William Rosenwald Family Fund commissioned her to execute a Carrara marble sculpture of U. S. Supreme Court Justice Louis D. Brandeis for Brandeis University in memory of William's father, Julius Rosenwald. The 1000-pound sculpture was unveiled in February 1957. The slightly larger than life sculpture depicted Brandeis from the waste up and was to be placed initially on a three-foot pedestal in the Hayden Science Building.

In 1969, Paeff's bronze relief of Martin Luther King was unveiled at Boston University by Coretta Scott King when she was on campus to give a convocation address.

Further reading
 Wingate, Jennifer. Motherhood, Memorials, and Anti-Militarism: Bashka Paeff's "Sacrifices of War". Woman's Art Journal, Vol. 29, No. 2 (Fall - Winter, 2008), pp. 31–40

Gallery

References

External links

 
 MacDowell Colony description
 AskArt description
 ArtsEditor
 MIT Tech article, 1928

1889 births
1979 deaths
American women sculptors
Emigrants from the Russian Empire to the United States
20th-century American sculptors
20th-century American women artists
Jewish artists
Jewish sculptors